The 2019 Leinster Senior Cup was the 118th staging of the Leinster Football Association's primary competition. It included all Leinster based League of Ireland clubs from the First Division and Premier Division, as well as a selection of intermediate level sides. The competition was won by St Patrick's Athletic

Teams

Preliminary round
The draw for the preliminary round and first round was made on 1 August 2018.

First round

Second round

Third round

Fourth round
The 12 Leinster teams from the League of Ireland join the competition in this round.

Quarter-finals

Semi-finals

Final

References

2019
2019 in Republic of Ireland association football cups